Grey River is a river located in the Magallanes Region of Chile. The river originates as the outflow of Grey Lake and flows for 20 km before it merges with the Serrano River.

See also
 Salto Grande

References

Grey
Rivers of Magallanes Region
Torres del Paine National Park